, is a volcanic island located in the Tokara Islands, part of the Kagoshima Prefecture, Japan. It is the largest and most populous island of the islands in Toshima village. The island, 34.47 km² in area, had 167 inhabitants .
The island has no airport, and access is normally by ferry to the city of Kagoshima on the mainland, seven hours away. The islanders are dependent mainly on agriculture, fishing and seasonal tourism. The island's attractions include hot springs, a lighthouse, an observatory and a museum of local history and folklore.

Geography

The mountain was mined for sulphur until 1944.

A small plateau separates Otake from eroded remains of another volcano.
The local climate is classified as subtropical, with a rainy season from May through September.

Climate

History
Nakanoshima has been populated for several thousand years.  The island was once part of the Ryukyu Kingdom. During the Edo period, Nakanoshima was part of Satsuma Domain and was administered as part of Kawabe District. In 1896, the island was transferred to the administrative control of Ōshima District, Kagoshima, and from 1911 was administered as part of the village of Toshima, Kagoshima. From 1946-1952, the island was administered by the United States as part of the Provisional Government of Northern Ryukyu Islands. Until 1956, the village hall for Toshima Village was located on Nakanoshima. It was then relocated to within the city of Kagoshima.

In early 1950, a small herd of wild horses in the south of the island were identified as a distinct breed, named the Tokara pony. This species only occurs on Nakanoshima and is believed to have been brought to the island around 1890 from Kikaijima, an island near Amami Ōshima. After World War II, the species almost became extinct, and survivors were removed to a ranch operated by Kagoshima University on mainland Kagoshima for protection . Today, some have been reintroduced to Nakanoshima.

Notes

References
National Geospatial Intelligence Agency (NGIA). Prostar Sailing Directions 2005 Japan Enroute. Prostar Publications (2005).

See also
 List of volcanoes in Japan

External links 

Tokara Village Official Website
 Nakanoshima - Japan Meteorological Agency 
 Nakanoshima: National catalogue of the active volcanoes in Japan(PDF) - Japan Meteorological Agency
 Nakanosima - Geological Survey of Japan

Tokara Islands
Volcanoes of Kagoshima Prefecture
Active volcanoes
Stratovolcanoes of Japan
Islands of Kagoshima Prefecture
Holocene stratovolcanoes